is a passenger railway station located in the city of Kyōtango, Kyoto Prefecture, Japan, operated by the private railway company Willer Trains (Kyoto Tango Railway).

Lines
Shōtenkyō Station is a station of the Miyazu Line, and is located 66.5 kilometers from the terminus of the line at Nishi-Maizuru Station.

Station layout
The station has two opposed ground-level side platforms connected to the station building by a level crossing. The station is attended.

Platforms

Adjacent stations

History

Passenger statistics
In fiscal 2018, the station was used by an average of 66 passengers daily.

Surrounding area
 Roadside Station Kumihama SANKAIKAN
 Japan National Route 178

See also
List of railway stations in Japan

References

External links

Official home page 

Railway stations in Kyoto Prefecture
Railway stations in Japan opened in 1932
Kyōtango